Clydebank Football Club are a Scottish football club based in the town of Clydebank, West Dunbartonshire. Formed in 2003, they are currently a member of the West of Scotland Football League.

The current Clydebank are a phoenix club formed after the previous Clydebank were bought out by Airdrie United and moved to Airdrie. Supporters currently fund this club.

History

Background 
In 1888 the first club by the name of Clydebank F.C. was formed. This team played home matches at Hamilton Park and competed in the Scottish Federation from 1891 to 1893. They folded in 1895, and were followed by another Clydebank F.C. in 1899 who soon became defunct in 1902. In 1900, Junior Football team, Duntocher F.C., based in the neighbouring village of Duntocher, moved to Clydebank and changed name to Clydebank Juniors.

A third club named Clydebank F.C. were formed in 1914. Playing their home games at Clydeholm they immediately joined the Scottish Football League, but by 1931 they had disbanded. In 1964 the owners of East Stirlingshire F.C., Jack and Charlie Steedman, merged the Falkirk-based team with Clydebank Juniors, naming the new entity East Stirlingshire Clydebank F.C.. ES Clydebank inherited East Stirlingshire's place in Division Two and played their home games at New Kilbowie. The merge, which was opposed by fans of both clubs, lasted only one season, with East Stirlingshire shareholders winning several court cases against it. East Stirlingshire reverted to its original legal status and moved back to Falkirk, parting company with the Steedman brothers.

The fourth Clydebank F.C. were formed in 1965 by the Steedman Brothers. The club joined the Scottish Football League in 1966 and by 1978 had reached the Premier Division, becoming the first club to play in all Scottish League divisions after league reconstruction in 1975. Clydebank spent most of the following seasons in the First Division, but their fortunes changed around 1996 when the Steedman brothers sold their New Kilbowie ground with no new stadium to replace it. Following the sale of Kilbowie the club played "home" games at Boghead Park in Dumbarton, then Cappielow Park in Greenock. After the liquidation of Airdrieonians, a consortium led by Jim Ballantyne put forward a bid to fill the vacancy in the SFL and build a new club in Airdrie from scratch. This effort failed, so instead the group bought the ailing Clydebank, renamed them Airdrie United, and moved the club to Airdrie.

Founding of the phoenix club 
During the 2002–03 season, the remaining Clydebank supporters were left without a team to follow as the transformation into Airdrie United happened too close to the beginning of the season to make alternative plans. In the following months, members of the UCS supporters' group met with the purpose of creating a new Clydebank F.C. Airdrie United Ltd agreed to voluntarily transfer their unwanted ownership of the name and insignia of Clydebank F.C. to UCS, and a venue for matches in the Clydebank area was secured following an agreement to ground share with Drumchapel Amateurs at Glenhead Park, Duntocher. For the 2002–03 season, Clydebank FC was the name used by the club's supporters team in the Scottish Supporters League.

The UCS group re-established Clydebank Football Club in 2003–04, entering the West Region structure of the Scottish Junior Football Association. The club won the league and gained promotion from Central League Division Two that season playing in front of up to 1,000 fans. In 2004–05 Clydebank finished third in Division One, missing out on a second successive promotion by one point on the last day of the season.

2005–06 saw record crowds since the rebirth of the club, with up to 1,600 watching Clydebank come within penalty kicks of reaching the last four of the Scottish Junior Cup – beaten after two 1–1 draws against Tayport. In 2006–07 the club were promoted to Super League Division One.

In June 2008, Clydebank and Drumchapel agreed to terminate their groundsharing agreement, with the Bankies moving across the town to share Holm Park with Yoker Athletic. Many ground improvements have already taken place at the long time established Junior ground.

2008–09 proved to be the most successful Clydebank season since reformation in 2003. A successful run to the final of the 2008–09 Scottish Junior Cup saw Clydebank defeat Petershill and Pollok, before falling at the final hurdle by two goals to one against Auchinleck Talbot. Around 3,700 Clydebank fans travelled to Rugby Park for the final, contributing to the total crowd of 8,122.

In 2011, the club won promotion to the West Super League Premier Division. In 2015, they were relegated to the Super League Division One. In 2017, the club won promotion back to the Super League Premier Division, where they remained until leaving Junior football.

The team were managed from their return to the Junior grade in 2003 until December 2016 by former Clydebank player Billy McGhie. Following McGhie's thirteen-year tenure, the club appointed former St Johnstone player Kieran McAnespie as their new manager in January 2017.

Due to ground improvements taking place at Holm Park, Clydebank agreed a short-term groundshare with Maryhill F.C. at Lochburn Park in Maryhill, Glasgow, for the 2018–19 season.
In the 2019–20 season they returned to the newly refurbished and renamed Holm Park Community Football Academy for the foreseeable future.

In June 2020, Clydebank opted not to retain their SJFA membership after all SJFA West Region teams moved to the newly formed West of Scotland League.

Current squad

Management team

Honours
West Super League First Division Runners-up: 2010–11, 2016–17
Central League Division Two: 2003–04
Division One Runners-up: 2006–07
Scottish Junior Cup Runners-up: 2008–09
Central League Cup Winners: 2009–10, 2011–12
Sectional League Cup Winners: 2013–14, 2017–18
Runners-up: 2006–07

See also
List of fan-owned sports teams
History of football in Clydebank

References

Bibliography

External links
Official Website

The Bankies Archive
Results and statistics for SFL entity 1966-2002 at Fitbastats

 
Association football clubs established in 2003
Football clubs in Scotland
Scottish Junior Football Association clubs
Football in West Dunbartonshire
Phoenix clubs (association football)
F.C.
West of Scotland Football League teams
2003 establishments in Scotland